Naiyaandi is a 2013 Indian Tamil-language romantic comedy film written and directed by A. Sarkunam. The film features Dhanush and Nazriya Nazim in the lead roles. The plot focuses on a love story between a Kuthu Vilakku (lamp) shop owner and a BDS student. It was released on 11 October 2013. The film is a remake of the 1993 Malayalam film Meleparambil Anveedu and its 1995 Tamil remake Valli Vara Pora. It received negative reviews and became a flop at the box office.

Plot 
This story begins with Chinna Vandu's brothers Paranjothi and Paranthavan, who are not yet married, despite their old age. Chinna Vandu, who studied in his uncle's son's home, falls in love with Vanaroja, who comes there to visit her grandmother and see the village festival. Chinna Vandu finds many ways to make Vanaroja fall in love, such as making her laugh, but she still does not fall in love with him. During the village festival, Vanaroja's ring goes missing, so her father Poongavanam comes there and tells everyone to find the ring for a reward of 1 lakh. Only Chinna Vandu finds it in front of Vanaroja, but he gives the ring to a poor lady to claim the prize, as Vanaroja does not like him. Seeing this, Vanaroja falls in love with him. Chinna Vandu makes a challenge to himself: to know whether Vanaroja's in love or not. He gets to know that Vanaroja is also in love with him.

Vanaroja leaves the village to her home but upon reaching, she finds her father has arranged her engagement with Krishna and has scheduled her marriage with Krishna on her birthday. Chinna Vandu comes to wish her for her birthday on that night and learns of the engagement. They both escape from Krishna and his henchmen. Chinna Vandu tells his cousin Soori he has eloped with Vanaroja and asks him to come and meet them. Soori tries to find a way for Chinna Vandu to live with Vanaroja, but Chinna Vandu tells him he has already married her. Soori tells them to hide their marriage and go to his family in Kumbakonam. Soori brings Vanaroja to Chinna Vandu's house, saying she is an orphan. His family accepts her in, but Chinna Vandu's brothers start to love Vanaroja. Chinna Vandu gets a shock of his life when his father decided to marry Vana Roja to Parnjothi. Vanaroja is shocked too and she argues with Chinna Vandu about the problem and tells to say the truth to his parents and somehow he manages to pacify her and they make love from that he makes sure his brothers do not marry her. After some days, their mother finds that Vanaroja is pregnant and expels her from the house. Meanwhile, Krishna's men find Vanaroja and kidnap her. Chinna Vandu finds Vanaroja captured by Krishna and follows him. He goes in a fight and wins, but Chinna Vandu is caught by his whole family, and his father Sambandham does not accept this, but Poongavanam comes and tells Sambandham that his daughter's life needs to be happy, and so finally he accepts their relationship.

Cast 

 Dhanush as Chinna Vandu
 Nazriya Nazim as Vanaroja
 Vamsi Krishna as Krishna
 Soori as Soori
 Sriman as Paramjothy chinna vandu's elder brother
 Sathyan as Parandhaman 'chinna vandu's second elder brother
 Pyramid Natarajan as Sambandham, Chinna Vandu's father
 Meera Krishnan as Chinna Vandu's mother
 Aadukalam Naren as Poongavanam vanaroja's father
 Sachu as Vanaroja's grandmother
 Sathish as Chinna Vandu's friend
 Ashvin Raja as Chinna Vandu's friend
 Imman Annachi as Tea Shop Owner
 Singampuli
 Charle 
 Manobala

Production 
In an interview with the Times of India, Sarkunam said, "Yes, Dhanush has agreed to play the lead in my next film and has signed up for the project though we are yet to confirm the producer." The film which was earlier titled as Sotta Vazhakutty was retitled Naiyaandi. While the names of Amala Paul, Samantha and Hansika Motwani were being floated around at various stages of the film's pre-production, the filmmaker has finally zeroed in on Nazriya Nazim, a child actress-turned-heroine in Mollywood, to pair opposite Dhanush. Director Sarkunam started the film on 13 Feb with other artists and Dhanush joined the shoot from 21 February.

Controversies 
Nazriya Nazim condemned the filmmakers for shooting several scenes of her character using a body double without her knowledge, such as an unseen woman's hip being rubbed, with the tummy/navel area being fully exposed, and it suggested the body double might be the heroine. She filed a complaint with the Chennai city Police Commissioner against Sarkunam, demanding that the director should show the film to her before its release. She withdrew the complaint after the scene that she had objected to was removed.

In November 2013, Malayalam producer Mani C. Kappan said that the story of the film was plagiarised from his Meleparambil Anveedu and he bought a stay for the film in Kerala. Mani C. Kappan says that he had planned to remake the film in Hindi and the Tamil release had weakened this opportunity. He also added that he will be doing a second part of the film in Malayalam in which Jagathi Sreekumar will do the same role in that of the previous one.

Release 
The satellite rights of the film were sold to Sun TV.

Reception 
Naiyaandi received negative reviews from critics.

Baradwaj Rangan wrote "Naiyaandi slavishly follows the Kollywood formula, with thoroughly exaggerated characters whom we see only on screen" and called the film a "vile mess". Sify wrote, "Naiyaandi is not astounding but it is not a damp squib like most draft comedies we’ve had in recent times". Behindwoods gave 2.25 out of 5 and wrote, "Naiyaandi provides a few laughs but is nothing that you have not seen before". The Times of India gave 2.75 out of 5 stars and wrote "Naiyandi is a leisurely-paced film, a genteel comedy set in a small town, revolving around a romance. But what sets it apart, in a rather unfortunate way from [Sarkunam's] earlier films, is that this time, the characters and scenes are less interesting, and the tone and rhythm of the film inconsistent". Hindustan Times wrote "Naiyaandi is a silly romp through school-boyish pranks, juvenile romantic inclinations, choreographed fights and a yawn of a story". Rediff gave 1.5 out of 5 stars and wrote that the film "lacks a good story and seems more like an amateur, half-hearted and a disappointing attempt" and called it a "disaster". Deccan Herald wrote "the slapstick comedy works in bits and parts. It suffers from a weak storyline and a sorry script". IANS gave 1.5 out of 5 and wrote "Naiyaandi is a mistake every talented actor commits in his career. This one belongs to Dhanush, who has majorly disappointed one and all". Oneindia rated it 2/5 and stated "The only saving grace in the movie is – Nazriya Nazim. Had she not played the female lead, it would have been difficult for audience to sit in the theatres till the end. Her controversy may not have helped the movie, but it has made people notice her talent. Dhanush has made a wrong choice"

Soundtrack 

The film's album composed by Ghibran released on 19 September 2013. The single "Teddy Bear", sung by Dhanush, was released on 17 September, two days before the full album was released. The song uses dubstep elements and sounds inspired by those in 8-bit video games.

References

External links 
 

2010s Tamil-language films
2013 films
2013 romantic comedy films
Films directed by A. Sarkunam
Films involved in plagiarism controversies
Indian romantic comedy films
Tamil remakes of Malayalam films
Indian films with live action and animation